Holonomic (introduced by Heinrich Hertz in 1894 from the Greek ὅλος meaning whole, entire and νόμ-ος meaning law) may refer to:

Mathematics
 Holonomic basis, a set of basis vector fields {ek} such that some coordinate system {xk} exists for which 
 Holonomic constraints, which are expressible as a function of the coordinates  and time 
 Holonomic module in the theory of D-modules
 Holonomic function, a smooth function that is a solution of a linear homogeneous differential equation with polynomial coefficients

Other uses
 Holonomic brain theory, model of cognitive function as being guided by a matrix of neurological wave interference patterns

See also
 Holonomy in differential geometry
 Holon (disambiguation)
 Nonholonomic system, in physics, a system whose state depends on the path taken in order to achieve it

References